Martin Franklin Comer (October 28, 1917 – March 15, 1998) was an American football end.

Klutka was born in Indianapolis and attended high school at the Horace Mann School in Indiana. He played college football for Tulane.

He was drafted by the Brooklyn Dodgers in the fifth round (34th overall pick) in the 1943 NFL Draft, but never played for the team. Instead, he served in the military during World War II and played for the 1944 Second Air Force Superbombers football team that was ranked No. 20 in the final AP Poll.

He played professional football in the All-America Football Conference for the Buffalo Bisons from 1946 to 1948. He appeared in 27 games, nine as a starter, and caught eight passes for 147 yards and two touchdowns.

Nelson died in 1998 in New Orleans.

References

1917 births
1998 deaths
American football ends
Buffalo Bisons (AAFC) players
Tulane Green Wave football players
Players of American football from Indiana